Acchedya Jagaddhita (born 12 May 1997) is an Indonesian weightlifter.

She represented Indonesia at the 2014 Summer Youth Olympics in Nanjing, China. She competed in the women's 58kg event where she finished in 4th place.

At the 2017 Islamic Solidarity Games held in Baku, Azerbaijan, she won the silver medal in the women's 58kg event. At the 2017 Asian Indoor and Martial Arts Games held in Ashgabat, Turkmenistan, she won the bronze medal in the women's 58kg event.

In 2018, she represented Indonesia at the Asian Games held in Jakarta, Indonesia in the women's 58kg event. She finished in 5th place.

In 2019, she tested positive for metandienone and was banned until 2023 by the International Weightlifting Federation.

References

External links 
 

Living people
1997 births
Place of birth missing (living people)
Indonesian female weightlifters
Weightlifters at the 2018 Asian Games
Asian Games competitors for Indonesia
Weightlifters at the 2014 Summer Youth Olympics
Islamic Solidarity Games medalists in weightlifting
Islamic Solidarity Games competitors for Indonesia
Indonesian sportspeople in doping cases
Doping cases in weightlifting
21st-century Indonesian women